Drag Race Italia is an Italian reality competition streaming and television series based on the American series RuPaul's Drag Race, and is the Italian edition of the Drag Race franchise, produced by Ballandi Arts Studios. In a similar format to the American version, the show features a crop of Italian drag queens as they compete for the title of "Italia's Next Drag Superstar" and becoming MAC Cosmetics ambassador for one year. The series airs on Discovery+ in Italy, and subsequently free-to-air on Real Time, and worldwide on WOW Presents Plus.

The series is hosted by Italian drag queen Priscilla, along with actress Chiara Francini and television personality Tommaso Zorzi.

The first episode of the inaugural season premiered on November 18, 2021. The cast was announced on October 29, 2021. A second season was announced on March 1, 2022 with the premiere confirmed for October 2022.

Production

Season 1 

Casting occurred in early 2021 with production starting in summer 2021. The  inaugural season of six one-hour episodes. Early coverage of the production announcement indicated that the series would be broadcast on the streaming platform Discovery+; followed later by a free-to-air broadcast on Real Time, which premiered on January 9, 2022.

In the United States the series premiered on WOW Presents Plus, the streaming service of RuPaul's Drag Race production company World of Wonder, concurrently with its Italian debut.

Season 2 

In March 2022, it was announced that the show was renewed for a second season. At the same time, it is announced that all the judges from the first season have also been reconfirmed.

Judges 
On June 30, 2021 it was announced that the judging panel for the first season would include Italian drag queen Priscilla, actress Chiara Francini and television personality Tommaso Zorzi.

Series overview

References

2020s LGBT-related reality television series
2021 in LGBT history
2021 Italian television series debuts
 
Italian reality television series
Italian television series based on American television series
LGBT in Italy
WOW Presents Plus original programming